The Kennebec Boat and Canoe Company was located in Waterville, Maine. Established in 1909 by George F. Terry, the company manufactured wooden canoes and boats until 1941.

History

The Kennebec Boat and canoe Company was founded by former railroad station agent, ice cutter, publisher and merchandiser George F. Terry. Walter D. Grant supervised the building of canoes for Terry, who had no personal experience building canoes. Grant had previously worked for the B.N. Morris Canoe Company of Veazie, Maine.  Grant's brother worked for the E.M. White Canoe Company and his sister was married to White. In 1930, Grant left Kennebec to found the Skowhegan Boat and Canoe Company whose canoes closely resemble those of Kennebec.

Walter Grant's prior connection to Morris suggests a reason for similarities between the canoes of Kennebec and  B.N. Morris. The Morris is known for having stems made of cedar, rather than hardwood. The cedar stem widens to three inches at its end and is diagnostic of the canoes built by B.N. Morris. Some Kennebec canoes share this feature as well, yet their profiles are that of the majority of Kennebec canoes, which have a narrow, hardwood stem. Terry hired men who had learned the trade from Morris, as well as those who had worked elsewhere, and  apparently gave the men free rein when it came to building canoes as it was not his field of expertise.

Terry’s son, George F. Terry, Jr., later joined the company and ran it until 1939. In 1939, the company was sold to Frank Terry and James Dean, who built a small number of canoes before closing in 1941.

Kennebec canoe

Kennebec canoes are known for their heart shaped decks and short rail caps, a trim commonly used on their open gunwale canoes.

Serial numbers consist of four to six digits followed by the length of the canoe, and are stamped on the upper face of the stem on the floor of the canoe or on a brass builder's plate. Records linking a serial number to original build-information may be accessed through the Wooden Canoe Heritage Association.

Canoe models 
Aristocrat  1918
Camp Chief  1932–1941
Camp Special  1918
Charles River 1915   1910–1916
Invisible Sponson  1929–1941
Junior  1922–1928

Katahdin  1922–1928, 1940–1941
K Special  1915–1917
Kennebec  1910–1941
Kineo  1910–1941
Maine Guides Model  1910–1941
Open Gunwale Canoe  1911–1918
Sponson Canoe  1911–1928
Torpedo  1917–1927
War Canoe  1915–1933
White Water Canoe  1940–1941

References 

Canoe manufacturers
Companies based in Kennebec County, Maine
Waterville, Maine
American companies established in 1909
Vehicle manufacturing companies established in 1909
Vehicle manufacturing companies disestablished in 1941
1909 establishments in Maine
1941 disestablishments in Maine
Defunct manufacturing companies based in Maine